Freddy Ndala Kasheba (died October 2004) was a Congolese guitarist, singer, and bandleader who was based in Tanzania for most of his career. In 1969, he emigrated from Zaire to Dar es Salaam, Tanzania. He became the leader of the group Orchestra Safari Sound in 1979, and remained its leader until leaving after a dispute with the owner of the band's equipment. He then started his own band, Zaita Musica, in addition to pursuing a solo career. His reputation in Tanzania was such that he became known in Dar es Salaam as "Maestro Supreme".

Discography
Yellow Card (Limitless Sky/Stern's, 2002)

References

2004 deaths
Immigrants to Tanzania
Democratic Republic of the Congo guitarists
Democratic Republic of the Congo emigrants to Tanzania
Tanzanian musicians